The 4th North-West Legislative Assembly was the 6th meeting of the Northwest Territories Legislature. It lasted from 1898 to 1902. This was also the first new council after the creation of the Yukon from the extreme northwest portion of the territories on June 13, 1898.

List of Members of the Legislative Assembly

References

External links
Election Results and Dates 1876 - 1905 from Saskatchewan Archives

004